Van Den Dungen is a Dutch surname. Notable people with the surname include:

Cassi Van Den Dungen (born 1992), Australian model
Frans-H. van den Dungen (1898–1965), Belgian scientist and academic

Surnames of Dutch origin